Luigi Carbonari (1880–1971) was an Italian politician from Trentino who was active in the agricultural cooperative movement.

Biography
Born in the village of Carbonare, Folgaria, in 1880, at the time part of the County of Tyrol, an estate of Austria-Hungary,  Carbonari completed studies in law and political science, graduating from the Universities of Vienna in 1907 and Heidelberg in 1908.

During his studies he was active in the movements for Italian language rights and autonomy for Trentino. In 1906, along with Alcide De Gasperi, he was imprisoned for taking part in demonstrations demanding the Italian University of Trieste and in 1907 he was arrested for calling for the Italian annexation of Trentino.

Carbonari was elected to Senate in 1948 serving one term until 1953. He served on the 8th Standing Commission on Agriculture and Food.

Craftsman-Farmer Alliance 
The Craftsman-Farmer Alliance (abbreviated A.C.A.) was a political party founded by Luigi Carbonari. The party contested the 1964 Trentino-Alto Adige regional election. It won 6,307 votes (2.63% in Trentino, 1.37% of the votes in the entire Trentino-Alto Adige/Südtirol), and one seat in the regional assembly from Trento (held by Carbonari). However, in the 1968 Trentino-Alto Adige regional election the party got 2,275 votes (0.92% of the votes in Trento, 0.48% in the entire region) and no seats.

References

1880 births
1971 deaths
People from Trentino
Italian People's Party (1919) politicians
Christian Democracy (Italy) politicians